Britton R. Webb (died January 16, 1860) was an American politician. He was the 14th Secretary of State of Mississippi, serving from January 10, 1860, to his death six days later.

Biography 
Webb represented Pontotoc County in the Mississippi House of Representatives in 1850. He then represented the same county in the Mississippi State Senate from 1854 to 1857 (inclusive). Webb was appointed as the Secretary of State of Mississippi on January 10, 1860, succeeding A. B. Dilworth. However, Webb died in office, in Jackson, Mississippi, on January 16, 1860, six days after being appointment. He was about 48 years old. Charles Albert Brougher was appointed to replace him as Secretary.

References 

1810s births
1860 deaths
Secretaries of State of Mississippi
Place of birth missing

Members of the Mississippi House of Representatives
Mississippi state senators